The Santa Marta porcupine (Coendou sanctamartae) is a rodent in the family Erethizontidae. It is known from dry forests on the lower slopes of the Sierra Nevada de Santa Marta and Serranía del Perijá mountains of northern Colombia, at altitudes below 500 and 1100 m, respectively, and intervening lowlands, and may also be present in nearby parts of Venezuela. It has been described as a subspecies of C. prehensilis, although the latter may be a species complex. Its karyotype has 2n = 74, FN = 82.

References

Coendou
Endemic fauna of Colombia
Mammals of Colombia
Sierra Nevada de Santa Marta
Rodents of South America
Mammals described in 1904
Taxobox binomials not recognized by IUCN